Struszia mccartneyi is a species of trilobite found in Silurian deposits of the Mackenzie Mountains in Canada. It is named after British musician Paul McCartney, being one of several in the genus Struszia named after members of The Beatles or people connected to the band.

See also
List of organisms named after famous people (born 1900–1949)

References

Encrinuridae
Fossil taxa described in 1993
Paul McCartney
Silurian trilobites of North America
Paleozoic life of the Northwest Territories
Paleozoic life of Nunavut